Welling is a district in the London Borough of Bexley, South East London, England.

Welling may also refer to:

People
 Georg von Welling (1652–1727), Bavarian alchemical and theosophical writer
 Tom Welling (born 1977), American actor

Places
 Welling, Alberta, Canada
 Welling Station, Alberta, Canada
 Welling, Germany
 Welling, Oklahoma, United States
 Welling Beach, Wisconsin, United States

See also
 Welwyn, a village in Hertfordshire, England
 Welwyn Garden City, a town in Hertfordshire, England